Polo Ondegardo (c. 1520 in Valladolid – 1575 in Ciudad Rica de La Plata) was a Spanish colonial jurist, civil servant, businessman and thinker who proposed an intellectual and political vision of profound influence in the earliest troubled stage of the contact between the Hispanic and the American Indigenous world. He was born in Valladolid, when the city was the capital of the kingdom of Castile, to a prominent noble family that had strong ties to the royal family. He spent his entire adult life in South America in what is now Peru and Bolivia. His administrative reports, well known and appreciated by his peers and contemporaries, have had wide repercussions in the field of Andean studies up to the present time.

Biography

Family and early life

There are no documentary elements that provide the date of the birth of Polo Ondegardo in the city of Valladolid, nor the years of his study at the University of Salamanca. From a testimonial statement made in March 1550, in which he stated that he was then over 30 years old, it can be inferred that he might be born around 1520 or perhaps some years earlier.

He was the eldest of the seven children of Diego López de León Ondegardo and Jerónima de Zárate.
Polo's uncle (his mother's brother) was Agustin de Zárate, fiscal auditor and general accountant of the Viceroyalty of Peru and Province of Tierra Firme and later chronicler.

Polo's father died in 1534 while he was studying in Valladolid for his bachelorship of law which he obtained in 1538. 
The Zárate family took direct charge of the education of the seven Ondegardo siblings with a financial aid of 7,000 maravedís by their grandfather and when he died in 1538 his property was partitioned between his children Agustin and Jerónima (Polo's mother).They both received the amount of 564,525 maravedís, distributed in household furniture, silver objects and income titles in the jurisdiction of Valladolid and nearby country. Through the same will Polo received a special grant of 90 ducats to complete his studies at the University of Salamanca. Unfortunately Polo's name does not appear in registers of the university which at the time were incomplete.

In Salamanca, Polo most probably attended the lessons of Francisco de Vitoria, founder of the philosophy of human rights known as School of Salamanca, which supported the just titles of Castile and the legitimacy of the war against the Native Americans, called Indians at that time, but defending the rights of the natives to be free from foreign dominion, to the possession of their goods and territories and to govern themselves.
In fact Polo's subsequent political position identified with the "intermediate" conception of the School of Salamanca, which distanced itself from the extreme positions either in favor of the Native Americans or the Spaniards. He defended the recognition of indigenous people as human beings, the preservation of their culture and traditional customs, and at the same time the promotion of evangelization by showing an attitude in favor of humanitarian principles but also in favor of the economic and political interests of the king.

Peru civil war
In 1543, having already obtained the title of licentiate, Polo joined his uncle Agustín de Zárate, appointed general accountant of Peru and Tierra Firme, and embarked for South America, in the huge (52 ships) fleet of Blasco Núñez Vela, the newly appointed first viceroy. Núñez  was charged with the task of enforcing the New Laws aimed at removing most of the power from the conquistadors and returning it to the king.
Polo traveled in the same galleon as his brother Diego de Zárate, the judges of the new  (Royal Tribunal) to be set up in Lima and the newly appointed governor of Nicaragua Rodrigo de Contreras (whose daughter Polo would later marry). 
On that ship traveled also Diego Martín, cleric and Hernando Pizarro's butler, who was charged of the interests of his lord in Peru and who carried out propaganda action spreading a negative image of the viceroy. Through Diego Martín, Polo became administrator of all of Hernando Pizarro's wealths.
After a stop in Panama, Polo arrived in Lima in June 1544, along with this uncle Agustín de Zárate and the other members of his entourage.

As soon as Polo was aware of this appointment, he changed his mind and joined the royalist troops in the Jauja Valley.
In April 1548, at the Battle of Jaquijahuana in today Pampa de Anta,  from Cusco, Pizarro's forces were defeated by Gasca's army. Pizarro and Carvajal were executed, while most of the pizarristas were pardoned. Polo was dispatched to Charcas (today Bolivia) as investigating judge of those involved in the rebellion.

Polo as encomendero in Charcas
While in Charcas he was charged by the local  with the task of understanding the work of indigenous workers in the silver mines in Potosí. To fulfill his task he carried out a survey with the kurakas (local indigenous governors) and indigenous workers of the Potosí mines. In order to collect the precious data he included in his manuscripts, Polo was probably the first person to carry out inquiries with interviews to people, in what has now become a well-known anthropological technique. His inquiries were programmed with scientific meticulousness, because, in addition to asking the Natives he included the data retrieved form quipus and the other few Inca graphic documents. 
At the end of his task Polo was also capable of sending more than 3,700 silver bars to the Royal Treasury.

Polo never forgot the support of the Zárate family to his studies at the University of Salamanca. There is a letter Polo wrote in 1550 from Potosí in which he states having instituted an income for the endowment of Isabelica, daughter of his unlce Agustín de Zárate.

At the beginning of 1550 he left his office of judge in Charcas and moved to Lima becoming an advisor on government business to the newly established archbishop Jerónimo de Loayza.

In the war against the rebel Francisco Hernández Girón, Polo, despite being a lawyer, fought as a royalist infantry captain at the Battle of Chuquinga and was seriously wounded by a harquebus to the leg in the battle of Pucara on October 8, 1554, where Girón was defeated, imprisoned and later executed.

 in Cusco
Polo became a very wealthy person. In 1557 he received an income of 10,000 ducats from the viceroyalty of Peru, for his office as attorney.

In 1558 Polo received from the viceroy Marquis of Cañete the appointment of corregidor (district governor and judicial official) of the province of Cuzco and took possession of this office at the end of the year.

In Cusco he carried out a deep inquiry on the religious practices of the natives, which led to his  (Treaty and inquiry into the errors and superstitions of the Indians).
He investigated in detail the religion and society of the Andean communities and found out the location of the huacas (shrines) along the ceque system in the four suyus (regions) of the former Inca Empire.

From the chroniclers either contemporary of Polo (Pedro Sarmiento de Gamboa, Cristóbal de Molina) or several years later, (José de Acosta, Antonio de la Calancha, Bernabé Cobo) it is known that he found the embalmed bodies and the representative statues ( statue, brother; called idols by the Spaniards) of several Sapa Incas and some of their wives. 
This achievement was notable for the church because the Incas mummified their dead rulers and continued to worship them after their death and their presence in the roundabouts of Cusco was a disturbance to the Christianization of the Natives. Polo could achieve the finding through his personal acquaintance with the kurakas (chiefs, indigenous governors) of the royal panakas (kinships of descendants of a Sapa Inca) whose collaboration they offered after the submission pact concluded with the Inca Sayri Túpac, presumed heir to the Inca Empire throne.
It is Inca Garcilaso de la Vega that in his Comentarios Reales de los Incas (Royal Commentaries of the Incas) describes the surprise he feels when visiting Polo's house and meeting the mummies of his ancestors so well preserved in time. Garcilaso was in fact the natural son of a Spanish conquistador and an Inca noblewoman, direct descendant of the Sapa Inca.
The mummies disappeared from the hospital and were never discovered despite archeological investigations in the last 70 years.

Polo carried out also a significant urban work in Cusco: he contracted the construction of the cathedral, new headquarters for the city council, a hospital and shelter for orphan girls and stonework bridges. Finally he regulated the procession of the Feast of Corpus Christi which was (and still is) directly related to the Andean Quyllurit'i festival, that marks the start of the harvest, signaled by the reappearance of the Pleiades after being hidden for a 40 days period.

Advisor to the Viceroy in Lima
There he wrote for the lawyer Briviesca de Muñatones, one of the commissioners in charge of the  problem, his  (Report on the perpetuity of the encomiendas in Peru).
In principle the  should have been assigned to living persons as a reward for their offices, but many  interpreted their right as hereditary.
Polo was a very rich  and in 1562 he obtained an additional distribution of 300 Natives for the cultivation of coca in his . Nevertheless, his office imposed him to have a better understanding of the matter, so he joined an expedition directed to the southern provinces to consult the local kurakas on the question.

Around 1564 Polo married Jerónima de Peñalosa, with whom he had six children. She was a Creole and daughter of Rodrigo Contreras, former governor of Nicaragua who had traveled from Spain to Panama on the same ship with Polo and after accusations of bad government had retired to Lima. 

The king of Spain was worried about the fact that the killing of the last Inca by Pizarro could be interpreted as a violation the European tradition of the divine right of kings, and that this might in turn endanger the legitimate right for the king to rule on the Tawantinsuyu. For this reason he had appointed Francisco de Toledo as viceroy in 1569 and charged him (among other tasks) with producing the proof that the Incas were tyrants, conquered their territories by subjugation of the local people and were not legitimate rulers. In turn the viceroy ordered the contemporary chroniclers Cristobal de Molina and particularly Pedro Sarmiento de Gamboa to provide such proof. Polo knew both an cooperated with them.
In January 1572 Sarmiento de Gamboa asked Polo for a testimonial statement in the survey on the history and genealogy of the Incas for Sarmiento's  (History of the Incas). Sarmiento had his book read in front of the kurakas form the royal panakas and a distinguished group of Spaniards in Cuzco in order to have a formal verification of his history which described the Incas as tyrants. Those present were asked to sign the manuscript.

Polo's second term in the government of the Cusco province, from August 1571 to October 1572, was intense. He completed the reduction of the natives in parishes, supported the incorporation of the yanakunas (servants of the Inca's court) into the Spanish crown, advised on the drafting of ordinances for the government of the city and for the cultivation of coca, and was an active supporter, through supply of food and ammunitions, in the war against the Inca rebel Túpac Amaru who was defeated by the Spanish army in Vilcabamba. In 1574 he wrote his  (Report on the war of the Chiriguano Indians).

Retirement and death
On March 18, 1575, he granted his will in La Plata, leaving his six minor children as heirs and on November 4 he died in the same city. His body was initially buried in the convent of San Francisco in La Plata.
Two years later Jerónima, Polo's widow, also died in her residence in La Plata, leaving to their six children a significant wealth.

Works
Polo Ondegardo was a civil servant and only wrote reports and letters, all of which were never published. Nevertheless, they were used by later writers and chroniclers to embed their information in the books they published.

In addition to serving as reports and advice to the viceroys and ecclesiastical authorities, they were used as a primary source by various chroniclers, often without even mentioning his name.
Polo's text were included in the works of Agustín de Zárate, Hernando de Santillán, José de Acosta, Antonio de la Calancha, Buenaventura Salinas y Córdoba, Bernabé Cobo, Martín de Murúa,González Pujana, Laura (1999). Polo de Ondegardo: un cronista vallisoletano en el Perú. Valladolid: Universidad de Valladolid. Cristóbal de Molina "el cuzqueño", Inca Garcilaso de la Vega, Francisco de Ávila and Pablo Joseph de Arriaga y Herrera.

Polo might have written several reports and letters but just a few of them have been recovered by scholars from the archives in Spain and Peru. His principal works are:

 [1559 / 1561?] (Treatise and inquiry into the errors and superstitions of the Indians) which deals with the Andean religion and was written at the request of the Archbishop of Lima Jerónimo de Loayza, and used in the second and third Provincial Councils of Lima (1567 and 1582). Its manuscript has been lost. Here the author expresses comments on the laws, the months of the year and related festivals, on sorcery, sacrifices, fortune-tellers, cures and doctors, that allow the scholars to reconstruct the Inca past. The drafting of this treatise, when Polo was Corregidor in Cuzco for his first term, was possible thanks to his widespread political and intellectual network. The treatise was produced at the request of the viceroy Marquis of Cañete and of Jerónimo de Loayza, archbishop of Lima, in 1559. They ordered Polo to find out about the idolatrous practices of the American Natives; in order to achieve this goal he gathered in the square of Cusco the kurakas and indigenous people of the area, summing up four hundred and seventy-five people between men and women, and subjected them to an inquiry. Polo reported also about human sacrifices of children performed by the Incas. Several years later Polo was harshly criticized by the Jesuit Blas Valera who questioned Polo's knowledge of Quechua and attributed Polo's statement to a misunderstanding of a quechua word: the sacrifices were of young animals and not young humans. Scholars have now confirmed, with archaeological discoveries, the existence of sacrifices of children, mostly in pair (male and female) for special purposes such as protecting against earthquakes or volcanic eruptions. Moreover, the scholars, through the comparison of Polo's works with other linguistics sources, confirmed his good knowledge of quechua and possibly also Aymara languages.
 [before 1561] (Report of the shrines of the Indians in the four ceques) which is fully included into Bernabé Cobo's  (History of the New World). Polo produced a list of the huacas that extended along the ceques starting from the Coricancha temple in Cusco towards the four directions of the four provinces of the Tawantinsuyu. Basing on the Polo's treatise, the Cusco ceque system was investigated in detail by R. Tom Zuidema, who confirmed his discoveries and descriptions.Zuidema, Reiner Tom; Hooykaas, Eva María (1964). The ceque system of Cuzco: the social organization of the capital of the Inca - MPublishing, University of Michigan Library
 [1561] (Report to the licentiate Briviesca de Muñatones on the perpetuity of the encomiendas in Peru) was drawn up according to the questionnaires established in the Royal Decree of 1553.
 [1561- 1570] (Report of the lineage of the Incas and how they extended their conquests). Polo names the Incas in a list that coincides with the one generally recorded by all the chroniclers but unfortunately does not clarify any of the many confusing points of the history of the Incas, nevertheless he refers to a previous report'' written by him on these issues, which was never retrieved but must have been very rich in data judging by what Polo states.
 [1562] (Ordinances of the Huamanga mines). It was requested by the Viceroy and drafted for a mercury mine after a new method for extracting silver using mercury was proposed by a Spaniard.
This letter may have been one of the bases for the initial set up of the legislation for Native Americans which was kept separate from the Spaniard's legislation.
 [1571] (True and legitimate dominion of the kings of Spain over Peru); a work on the presumed tyranny of the Incas, supporting the just titles of the king of Spain to rule in South America.
 [1571] (Account of the basic principles regarding the notable harm that results from not preserving the Indians’ laws for them). It was addressed to Viceroy Francisco de Toledo who used it as a source for his ordinances when Polo was one of his advisers. The report may have been written before Toledo's term. This report is principally a legal and economic treatise which includes valuable economic and ethnographic information for the understanding of indigenous power elites and the emerging colonial society. Moreover, it provides a model of Hispanic-indigenous relationship based on the respect for traditional indigenous local laws. Nevertheless, this proposal was not taken into account by the different viceroys.
 [1574] (Report on the war of the Chiriguano Indians), written shortly before Polo's death.

Pre-Hispanic local taxes and laws 
The Castile's juridical tradition had familiarized Polo with the coexistence of various legal systems and, most importantly, with their official recognition, such as those related to "other" religions: the Islamic and the Judaic ones, together with the respect for human dignity and cultural tolerance proposed at the Salamanca school by Francisco de Vitoria and his radical follower Bartolomé de las Casas.
In his reports he presented to the Spanish authorities the main rites and beliefs of the Andean communities, the pre-Hispanic tax system, the distribution and use of natural resources and the administrative, economic and political complexity of the Tahuantinsuyu. 
Polo believed that the best way to control Andean people was to understand their culture.
He supported the idea that the old pre-Hispanic law could be used to reduce the litigations, set up a local tax system based on the Incan one and to achieve a more successful colonization. To this end he suggested that the Spaniards' interests, in most cases, lay in preserving Andean institutions as they had found them. Viceroy Toledo did not accept his view and never adopted such a proposal.

Quipu
Polo was among the first ones to recognize the value of quipus as registers. Polo postulated the idea that the quipus represented a registration system that allowed for an easy incorporation of information, not only numbers. In his writings Polo was astonished by the accuracy of the accounts kept in quipus. His conclusion was that they are instruments of all trust. He checked their accuracy by asking quipu managers to record some data and retrieved them some days later finding that they corresponded to Polo's own records in writing.

Further reading
 González Pujana, Laura (1993). La vida y la obra del Licenciado Polo de Ondegardo. Valladolid: Universidad de Valladolid. (in Spanish)
 González Pujana, Laura (1999). Polo de Ondegardo: un cronista vallisoletano en el Perú. Valladolid: Universidad de Valladolid. (in Spanish)
 Hampe Martínez,  Teodoro (2016). El licenciado Polo Ondegardo (1520-1575). Biografía de un jurista castellano en los Andes coloniales - in XVIII Congreso Internacional de Historia del Derecho Indiano - Córdoba 2012 - Instituto Internacional de Historia del Derecho Indiano / editors:  Aspell, Marcela; Agüero Alejandro; Llamosas, Esteban Federico -  1st edition 2016 - Universidad Nacional de Córdoba, Volume II  (in Spanish)
 Velaochaga Dam, Carlos; Herrera Villagra, Alejandro; Warthon Calero, Rafael (eds.) (2017). Crónicas tempranas del siglo XVI. Tomo II. El patrimonio hegemónico de la escritura: Descripciones historiográficas del Cusco (1542-1590) - Dirección Desconcentrada de Cultura de Cusco – Ministerio de Cultura de Peru (in Spanish)
 Bauer, Brian S.; Smith-Oka Vania; E. Cantarutti, Gabriel (editors) (2011) Account of the Fables and Rites of the Incas by Cristóbal de Molina - With an introduction by Brian S. Bauer - University of Texas Press
 The History of the Incas by Pedro Sarmiento de Gamboa [1572] translated and edited by Brian S. Bauer and Vania Smith introduction by Brian S. Bauer and Jean-Jacques Decoster - University of Texas Press Austin - 2007

See also 
Spanish conquest of the Inca Empire
Inca Empire
Ceque system
Quipu
Panakas and ayllu
Agustin de Zárate
Pedro Sarmiento de Gamboa
Inca Garcilaso de la Vega
Francisco Pizarro
Hernando Pizarro
Gonzalo Pizarro
Blasco Núñez Vela
Francisco de Toledo

References

Spanish colonial governors and administrators
16th-century South American people
1520 births
1575 deaths
Year of birth uncertain